Breathing (or ventilation) is the process of moving air into and from the lungs to facilitate gas exchange with the internal environment, mostly to flush out carbon dioxide and bring in oxygen.

All aerobic creatures need oxygen for cellular respiration, which extracts energy from the reaction of oxygen with molecules derived from food and produces carbon dioxide as a waste product. Breathing, or "external respiration", brings air into the lungs where gas exchange takes place in the alveoli through diffusion. The body's circulatory system transports these gases to and from the cells, where "cellular respiration" takes place.

The breathing of all vertebrates with lungs consists of repetitive cycles of inhalation and exhalation through a highly branched system of tubes or airways which lead from the nose to the alveoli. The number of respiratory cycles per minute is the breathing or respiratory rate, and is one of the four primary vital signs of life. Under normal conditions the breathing depth and rate is automatically, and unconsciously, controlled by several homeostatic mechanisms which keep the partial pressures of carbon dioxide and oxygen in the arterial blood constant. Keeping the partial pressure of carbon dioxide in the arterial blood unchanged under a wide variety of physiological circumstances, contributes significantly to tight control of the pH of the extracellular fluids (ECF). Over-breathing (hyperventilation) and under-breathing (hypoventilation), which decrease and increase the arterial partial pressure of carbon dioxide respectively, cause a rise in the pH of ECF in the first case, and a lowering of the pH in the second. Both cause distressing symptoms.

Breathing has other important functions. It provides a mechanism for speech, laughter and similar expressions of the emotions. It is also used for reflexes such as yawning, coughing and sneezing. Animals that cannot thermoregulate by perspiration, because they lack sufficient sweat glands, may lose heat by evaporation through panting.

Mechanics

The lungs are not capable of inflating themselves, and will expand only when there is an increase in the volume of the thoracic cavity. In humans, as in the other mammals, this is achieved primarily through the contraction of the diaphragm, but also by the contraction of the intercostal muscles which pull the rib cage upwards and outwards as shown in the diagrams on the right. During forceful inhalation (Figure on the right) the accessory muscles of inhalation, which connect the ribs and sternum to the cervical vertebrae and base of the skull, in many cases through an intermediary attachment to the clavicles, exaggerate the pump handle and bucket handle movements (see illustrations on the left), bringing about a greater change in the volume of the chest cavity. During exhalation (breathing out), at rest, all the muscles of inhalation relax, returning the chest and abdomen to a position called the "resting position", which is determined by their anatomical elasticity. At this point the lungs contain the functional residual capacity of air, which, in the adult human, has a volume of about 2.5–3.0 liters.

During heavy breathing (hyperpnea) as, for instance, during exercise, exhalation is brought about by relaxation of all the muscles of inhalation, (in the same way as at rest), but, in addition, the abdominal muscles, instead of being passive, now contract strongly causing the rib cage to be pulled downwards (front and sides). This not only decreases the size of the rib cage but also pushes the abdominal organs upwards against the diaphragm which consequently bulges deeply into the thorax. The end-exhalatory lung volume is now less air than the resting "functional residual capacity". However, in a normal mammal, the lungs cannot be emptied completely. In an adult human, there is always still at least one liter of residual air left in the lungs after maximum exhalation.

Diaphragmatic breathing causes the abdomen to rhythmically bulge out and fall back. It is, therefore, often referred to as "abdominal breathing". These terms are often used interchangeably because they describe the same action.

When the accessory muscles of inhalation are activated, especially during labored breathing, the clavicles are pulled upwards, as explained above. This external manifestation of the use of the accessory muscles of inhalation is sometimes referred to as clavicular breathing, seen especially during asthma attacks and in people with chronic obstructive pulmonary disease.

Passage of air

Upper airways

Ideally, air is breathed first out and secondly in through the nose. The nasal cavities (between the nostrils and the pharynx) are quite narrow, firstly by being divided in two by the nasal septum, and secondly by lateral walls that have several longitudinal folds, or shelves, called
nasal conchae, thus exposing a large area of nasal mucous membrane to the air as it is inhaled (and exhaled). This causes the inhaled air to take up moisture from the wet mucus, and warmth from the underlying blood vessels, so that the air is very nearly saturated with water vapor and is at almost body temperature by the time it reaches the larynx. Part of this moisture and heat is recaptured as the exhaled air moves out over the partially dried-out, cooled mucus in the nasal passages, during exhalation. The sticky mucus also traps much of the particulate matter that is breathed in, preventing it from reaching the lungs.

Lower airways
The anatomy of a typical mammalian respiratory system, below the structures normally listed among the "upper airways" (the nasal cavities, the pharynx, and larynx), is often described as a respiratory tree or tracheobronchial tree (figure on the left). Larger airways give rise to branches that are slightly narrower, but more numerous than the "trunk" airway that gives rise to the branches. The human respiratory tree may consist of, on average, 23 such branchings into progressively smaller airways, while the respiratory tree of the mouse has up to 13 such branchings. Proximal divisions (those closest to the top of the tree, such as the trachea and bronchi) function mainly to transmit air to the lower airways. Later divisions such as the respiratory bronchioles, alveolar ducts and alveoli are specialized for gas exchange.

The trachea and the first portions of the main bronchi are outside the lungs. The rest of the "tree" branches within the lungs, and ultimately extends to every part of the lungs.

The alveoli are the blind-ended terminals of the "tree", meaning that any air that enters them has to exit the same way it came. A system such as this creates dead space, a term for the volume of air that fills the airways at the end of inhalation, and is breathed out, unchanged, during the next exhalation, never having reached the alveoli. Similarly, the dead space is filled with alveolar air at the end of exhalation, which is the first air to breathed back into the alveoli during inhalation, before any fresh air which follows after it. The dead space volume of a typical adult human is about 150 ml.

Gas exchange

The primary purpose of breathing is to refresh air in the alveoli so that gas exchange can take place in the blood. The equilibration of the partial pressures of the gases in the alveolar blood and the alveolar air occurs by diffusion. After exhaling, adult human lungs still contain 2.5–3 L of air, their functional residual capacity or FRC. On inhalation, only about 350 mL of new, warm, moistened atmospheric air is brought in and is well mixed with the FRC. Consequently, the gas composition of the FRC changes very little during the breathing cycle. This means that the pulmonary, capillary blood always equilibrates with a relatively constant air composition in the lungs and the diffusion rate with arterial blood gases remains equally constant with each breath. Body tissues are therefore not exposed to large swings in oxygen and carbon dioxide tensions in the blood caused by the breathing cycle, and the peripheral and central chemoreceptors measure only gradual changes in dissolved gases. Thus the homeostatic control of the breathing rate depends only on the partial pressures of oxygen and carbon dioxide in the arterial blood, which then also maintains a constant pH of the blood.

Control

The rate and depth of breathing is automatically controlled by the respiratory centers that receive information from the peripheral and central chemoreceptors. These chemoreceptors continuously monitor the partial pressures of carbon dioxide and oxygen in the arterial blood. The first of these sensors are the central chemoreceptors on the surface of the medulla oblongata of the brain stem which are particularly sensitive to pH as well as the partial pressure of carbon dioxide in the blood and cerebrospinal fluid. The second group of sensors measure the partial pressure of oxygen in the arterial blood. Together the latter are known as the peripheral chemoreceptors, and are situated in the aortic and carotid bodies. Information from all of these chemoreceptors is conveyed to the respiratory centers in the pons and medulla oblongata, which responds to fluctuations in the partial pressures of carbon dioxide and oxygen in the arterial blood by adjusting the rate and depth of breathing, in such a way as to restore the partial pressure of carbon dioxide to 5.3 kPa (40 mm Hg), the pH to 7.4 and, to a lesser extent, the partial pressure of oxygen to 13 kPa (100 mm Hg). For example, exercise increases the production of carbon dioxide by the active muscles. This carbon dioxide diffuses into the venous blood and ultimately raises the partial pressure of carbon dioxide in the arterial blood. This is immediately sensed by the carbon dioxide chemoreceptors on the brain stem. The respiratory centers respond to this information by causing the rate and depth of breathing to increase to such an extent that the partial pressures of carbon dioxide and oxygen in the arterial blood return almost immediately to the same levels as at rest. The respiratory centers communicate with the muscles of breathing via motor nerves, of which the phrenic nerves, which innervate the diaphragm, are probably the most important.

Automatic breathing can be overridden to a limited extent by simple choice, or to facilitate swimming, speech, singing or other vocal training. It is impossible to suppress the urge to breathe to the point of hypoxia but training can increase the ability to hold one's breath. Conscious breathing practices have been shown to promote relaxation and stress relief but have not been proven to have any other health benefits.

Other automatic breathing control reflexes also exist. Submersion, particularly of the face, in cold water, triggers a response called the diving reflex. This has the initial result of shutting down the airways against the influx of water. The metabolic rate slows right down. This is coupled with intense vasoconstriction of the arteries to the limbs and abdominal viscera, reserving the oxygen that is in blood and lungs at the beginning of the dive almost exclusively for the heart and the brain. The diving reflex is an often-used response in animals that routinely need to dive, such as penguins, seals and whales. It is also more effective in very young infants and children than in adults.

Composition

Inhaled air is by volume 78% nitrogen, 20.95% oxygen and small amounts of other gases including argon, carbon dioxide, neon, helium, and hydrogen.

The gas exhaled is 4% to 5% by volume of carbon dioxide, about a 100 fold increase over the inhaled amount. The volume of oxygen is reduced by a small amount, 4% to 5%, compared to the oxygen inhaled. The typical composition is:

5.0–6.3% water vapor 
79% nitrogen 
13.6–16.0% oxygen
4.0–5.3% carbon dioxide
1% argon 
 parts per million (ppm) of hydrogen, from the metabolic activity of microorganisms in the large intestine.
ppm of carbon monoxide from degradation of heme proteins.
1 ppm of ammonia. 
 Trace many hundreds of volatile organic compounds especially isoprene and acetone. The presence of certain organic compounds indicate disease.

In addition to air, underwater divers practicing technical diving may breathe oxygen-rich, oxygen-depleted or helium-rich breathing gas mixtures. Oxygen and analgesic gases are sometimes given to patients under medical care. The atmosphere in space suits is pure oxygen. However, this is kept at around 20% of Earthbound atmospheric pressure to regulate the rate of inspiration.

Effects of ambient air pressure

Breathing at altitude

Atmospheric pressure decreases with the height above sea level (altitude) and since the alveoli are open to the outside air through the open airways, the pressure in the lungs also decreases at the same rate with altitude. At altitude, a pressure differential is still required to drive air into and out of the lungs as it is at sea level. The mechanism for breathing at altitude is essentially identical to breathing at sea level but with the following differences:

The atmospheric pressure decreases exponentially with altitude, roughly halving with every  rise in altitude. The composition of atmospheric air is, however, almost constant below 80 km, as a result of the continuous mixing effect of the weather. The concentration of oxygen in the air (mmols O2 per liter of air) therefore decreases at the same rate as the atmospheric pressure. At sea level, where the ambient pressure is about 100 kPa, oxygen constitutes 21% of the atmosphere and the partial pressure of oxygen is 21 kPa (i.e. 21% of 100 kPa). At the summit of Mount Everest, where the total atmospheric pressure is 33.7 kPa, oxygen still constitutes 21% of the atmosphere but its partial pressure is only 7.1 kPa (i.e. 21% of 33.7 kPa = 7.1 kPa). Therefore, a greater volume of air must be inhaled at altitude than at sea level in order to breathe in the same amount of oxygen in a given period.

During inhalation, air is warmed and saturated with water vapor as it passes through the nose and pharynx before it enters the alveoli. The saturated vapor pressure of water is dependent only on temperature; at a body core temperature of 37 °C it is 6.3 kPa (47.0 mmHg), regardless of any other influences, including altitude. Consequently, at sea level, the tracheal air (immediately before the inhaled air enters the alveoli) consists of: water vapor ( = 6.3 kPa), nitrogen ( = 74.0 kPa), oxygen ( = 19.7 kPa) and trace amounts of carbon dioxide and other gases, a total of 100 kPa.

The pressure gradient forcing air into the lungs during inhalation is also reduced by altitude. Doubling the volume of the lungs halves the pressure in the lungs at any altitude. Having the sea level air pressure (100 kPa) results in a pressure gradient of 50 kPa but doing the same at 5500 m, where the atmospheric pressure is 50 kPa, a doubling of the volume of the lungs results in a pressure gradient of the only 25 kPa. In practice, because we breathe in a gentle, cyclical manner that generates pressure gradients of only 2–3 kPa, this has little effect on the actual rate of inflow into the lungs and is easily compensated for by breathing slightly deeper. The lower viscosity of air at altitude allows air to flow more easily and this also helps compensate for any loss of pressure gradient.

All of the above effects of low atmospheric pressure on breathing are normally accommodated by increasing the respiratory minute volume (the volume of air breathed in — or out — per minute), and the mechanism for doing this is automatic. This homeostatic mechanism prioritizes the regulation of the arterial  over that of oxygen at sea level. That is to say, at sea level the arterial  is maintained at very close to 5.3 kPa (or 40 mmHg) under a wide range of circumstances, at the expense of the arterial , which is allowed to vary within a very wide range of values, before eliciting a corrective ventilatory response. However, when the atmospheric pressure (and therefore the atmospheric ) falls to below 75% of its value at sea level, oxygen homeostasis is given priority over carbon dioxide homeostasis. If this switch occurs relatively abruptly, the hyperventilation at high altitude will cause a severe fall in the arterial  with a consequent rise in the pH of the arterial plasma leading to respiratory alkalosis. This is one contributor to high altitude sickness. On the other hand, if the switch to oxygen homeostasis is incomplete, then hypoxia may complicate the clinical picture with potentially fatal results.

Breathing at depth

Pressure increases with the depth of water at the rate of about one atmosphere — slightly more than 100 kPa, or one bar, for every 10 meters. Air breathed underwater by divers is at the ambient pressure of the surrounding water and this has a complex range of physiological and biochemical implications. If not properly managed, breathing compressed gasses underwater may lead to several diving disorders which include pulmonary barotrauma, decompression sickness, nitrogen narcosis, and oxygen toxicity. The effects of breathing gasses under pressure are further complicated by the use of one or more special gas mixtures.

Air is provided by a diving regulator, which reduces the high pressure in a diving cylinder to the ambient pressure. The breathing performance of regulators is a factor when choosing a suitable regulator for the type of diving to be undertaken. It is desirable that breathing from a regulator requires low effort even when supplying large amounts of air. It is also recommended that it supplies air smoothly without any sudden changes in resistance while inhaling or exhaling. In the graph, right, note the initial spike in pressure on exhaling to open the exhaust valve and that the initial drop in pressure on inhaling is soon overcome as the Venturi effect designed into the regulator to allow an easy draw of air. Many regulators have an adjustment to change the ease of inhaling so that breathing is effortless.

Respiratory disorders

Abnormal breathing patterns include Kussmaul breathing, Biot's respiration and Cheyne–Stokes respiration.

Other breathing disorders include shortness of breath (dyspnea), stridor, apnea, sleep apnea (most commonly obstructive sleep apnea), mouth breathing, and snoring. Many conditions are associated with obstructed airways. Chronic mouth breathing may be associated with illness. Hypopnea refers to overly shallow breathing; hyperpnea refers to fast and deep breathing brought on by a demand for more oxygen, as for example by exercise. The terms hypoventilation and hyperventilation also refer to shallow breathing and fast and deep breathing respectively, but under inappropriate circumstances or disease. However, this distinction (between, for instance, hyperpnea and hyperventilation) is not always adhered to, so that these terms are frequently used interchangeably.

A range of breath tests can be used to diagnose diseases such as dietary intolerances.
A rhinomanometer uses acoustic technology to examine the air flow through the nasal passages.

Society and culture
The word "spirit" comes from the Latin spiritus, meaning breath. Historically, breath has often been considered in terms of the concept of life force. The Hebrew Bible refers to God breathing the breath of life into clay to make Adam a living soul (nephesh). It also refers to the breath as returning to God when a mortal dies. The terms spirit, prana, the Polynesian mana, the Hebrew ruach and the psyche in psychology are related to the concept of breath.

In T'ai chi, aerobic exercise is combined with breathing exercises to strengthen the diaphragm muscles, improve posture and make better use of the body's qi. Different forms of meditation, and yoga advocate various breathing methods. A form of Buddhist meditation called anapanasati meaning mindfulness of breath was first introduced by Buddha. Breathing disciplines are incorporated into meditation, certain forms of yoga such as pranayama, and the Buteyko method as a treatment for asthma and other conditions.

In music, some wind instrument players use a technique called circular breathing. Singers also rely on breath control.

Common cultural expressions related to breathing include: "to catch my breath", "took my breath away", "inspiration", "to expire", "get my breath back".

Breathing and mood
Certain breathing patterns have a tendency to occur with certain moods. Due to this relationship, practitioners of various disciplines consider that they can encourage the occurrence of a particular mood by adopting the breathing pattern that it most commonly occurs in conjunction with. For instance, and perhaps the most common recommendation is that deeper breathing which utilizes the diaphragm and abdomen more can encourage relaxation. Practitioners of different disciplines often interpret the importance of breathing regulation and its perceived influence on mood in different ways. Buddhists may consider that it helps precipitate a sense of inner-peace, holistic healers that it encourages an overall state of health and business advisers that it provides relief from work-based stress.

Breathing and physical exercise

During physical exercise, a deeper breathing pattern is adapted to facilitate greater oxygen absorption. An additional reason for the adoption of a deeper breathing pattern is to strengthen the body's core. During the process of deep breathing, the thoracic diaphragm adopts a lower position in the core and this helps to generate intra-abdominal pressure which strengthens the lumbar spine. Typically, this allows for more powerful physical movements to be performed. As such, it is frequently recommended when lifting heavy weights to take a deep breath or adopt a deeper breathing pattern.

See also

Further reading

References

External links

Respiration
Reflexes
Human body
Gases
Articles containing video clips